was a professional wrestling event promoted by DDT Pro-Wrestling (DDT). The event took place on August 28, 2016, in Tokyo at the Ryōgoku Kokugikan. The event featured twelve matches, six of which were contested for championships. The event aired on Fighting TV Samurai.

Terry Funk was originally scheduled to appear at the event but was forced to cancel due to an abdominal hernia.

Storylines
The Ryōgoku Peter Pan 2016 event featured twelve professional wrestling matches that involved different wrestlers from pre-existing scripted feuds and storylines. Wrestlers portrayed villains, heroes, or less distinguishable characters in the scripted events that built tension and culminated in a wrestling match or series of matches.

On September 14, 2015, Kudo suffered an anterior cruciate ligament injury while taking part in Pro Wrestling Noah's 2015 NTV G+ Cup Junior Heavyweight Tag League. On September 17, he announced that the injury required surgery, which would sideline him for about a year. After eleven months, DDT announced that Kudo would make his return at Ryōgoku Peter Pan 2016.

By winning the King of DDT tournament on June 26, Shuji Ishikawa earned a title match in the main event against KO-D Openweight Champion Konosuke Takeshita.

Event
The dark match was a King of Dark Championship six-man tag team match. Chikara was the reigning champion going into the match. Per its special rules, this title is awarded to the loser of the match. In the case of a tag match, whoever gets pinned by the champion becomes the new champion.

The next match was a Tokyo Joshi Pro Wrestling exhibition match featuring six TJPW wrestlers.

On the main card, the next match, dubbed "DNA Fights: Battle of Last Summer", was an exhibition match from DDT New Attitude (DNA), DDT's developmental brand.

At 2:23 pm, between the third and fourth matches, a yakitori pinned Toru Owashi to become the 1,163rd Ironman Heavymetalweight Champion.

Next was a Rumble rules match for the Ironman Heavymetalweight Championship. Amongst the participants was Jun Kasai from the hardcore promotion Pro-Wrestling Freedoms. The champion yakitori entered first but was eaten by Cherry (the third entrant) who was then declared the 1,164th champion. Keisuke Ishii (the seventh entrant) forced Cherry to submit with a single leg crab to eliminate her from the match and become the 1,165th champion. A few minutes later, Yoshihiko (an inflatable love doll which was the last entrant) eliminated Ishii with a rear naked choke, forcing him to submit and becoming the 1,166th champion. Seconds later, Toru Owashi pinned Kazuki Hirata and Yoshihiko at the same time with La Magistral to win the match and become the 1,167th champion. After the match, Joey Ryan pinned Owashi by surprise to become the 1,168th champion.

Next was a tag team match, dubbed "Yellow Dragon Comes Back!!" which saw the return of Kudo after being absent for almost a year due to an injury.

The next match, an eight-man tag team match, was dubbed "The NωA's Road To Participating In The 2016 DDT Festival" and featured Super Sasadango Machine acting as the NωA General Manager and giving a Powerpoint presentation entitled "Sasadango Teaches The Way To Survive In The Show Business Industry".

Next, Soma Takao challenged Hikaru Sato for the World Junior Heavyweight Championship, All Japan Pro-Wrestling's top junior heavyweight title.

Next, Danshoku Dino challenged LiLiCo for the DDT Extreme Championship in a "Watase Contra Watase" match where Mizuki Watase was free to intervene in the match and where the loser would be forbidden to meet with Watase ever again.

Then, at 4:56 pm, Joey Ryan lost the Ironman Heavymetalweight Championship to a yakitori by choking on it when a referee counted this as a submission and declared the yakitori the 1,169th champion.

Next was a six-man tag team match that saw the participation of Nosawa, Shiro Koshinaka and The Great Kabuki.

Next was a tag team match that saw the participation of Dick Togo.

Next, Harashima and Yuko Miyamoto challenged Kai from Wrestle-1 and Ken Ohka for the KO-D Tag Team Championship in a match sponsored by Uchicomi!.

In the main event, Shuji Ishikawa challenged Konosuke Takeshita for the KO-D Openweight Championship. Ishikawa won the bout and was granted a 2,000,000 yen prize by Good Com Asset, the sponsor of the match.

After the match, Ryota Yamasato ate the champion yakitori to become the 1,170th Ironman Heavymetalweight champion.

Results

Rumble rules match

Footnotes

References

External links
The official DDT Pro-Wrestling website
Ryōgoku Peter Pan 2016 at ProWrestlingHistory.com

DDT Peter Pan
2016 in professional wrestling
August 2016 events in Japan
Professional wrestling in Tokyo
2016 in Tokyo
Events in Tokyo